Platypleura is a genus of cicadas that occurs widely across Africa and southern Asia. Some of the South African species are remarkable for their endothermic thermoregulation that enables crepuscular signalling, an adaptation that reduces risk of predation and enables a greater range for their calls. In field experiments their maximum body temperature while calling at dusk, was measured at 22 °C above ambient temperature.

The Platypleurini are distributed from the Cape in South Africa, throughout sub-Saharan Africa and Madagascar, through India and south East Asia, to Japan. The faunas of West Africa and Madagascar are distinctive, while those of southern and east Africa resemble the Asian group. Endothermy occurs in several large-bodied South American and South African species, but not in related small-bodied species.

List of species
Platypleura affinis (Fabricius, 1803)
Platypleura afzelii Stål, 1854
Platypleura albigera Walker, 1850 – Western Cape, Eastern Cape
Platypleura albivannata Hayashi, 1974 – Japan
Platypleura andamana Distant, 1878 – Andaman Islands
Platypleura arabica Myers, 1928 – United Arab Emirates
Platypleura argentata Villet, 1987 – Kwazulu-Natal, South Africa
Platypleura arminops (Noualhier, 1896) – Thailand
Platypleura assamensis Atkinson, 1884 – Jalpaiguri
Platypleura auropilosa (Kato, 1940) – Thailand
Platypleura basimacula Walker, 1850 – Kwazulu-Natal, Mpumalanga, Limpopo, Northwest Province, Free State, Mozambique, Zimbabwe
Platypleura basi-viridis Walker, 1850 – India
Platypleura bettoni Distant, 1904
Platypleura bombifrons Karsch, 1890 – Mpumalanga, Limpopo, Zimbabwe
Platypleura brevis Walker, 1850 – Kwazulu-Natal, Mpumalanga, Limpopo, Botswana, Zimbabwe, Malawi
Platypleura brunea Villet, 1989a – Eastern Cape, South Africa
Platypleura canescens Walker, 1870 – East Timor
Platypleura capensis (Linnaeus, 1764) – Western Cape and Eastern Cape, South Africa on Metalasia muricata, Brachylaena discolor
Platypleura capitata (Olivier, 1790)
Platypleura centralis Distant, 1897
Platypleura chalybaea Villet, 1989a – Eastern Cape, South Africa on Euphorbia triangularis
Platypleura ciliaris (Linnaeus, 1758)
Platypleura clara Amyot & Serville, 1843
Platypleura deusta (Thunberg, 1822) – Mpumalanga, Kwazulu-Natal and Lesotho, South Africa on Leucosidea sericea, Cliffortia
Platypleura divisa (Germar, 1834) – Gauteng, Mpumalanga, Kwazulu-Natal and Eastern Cape, South Africa on Maytenus heterophylla
Platypleura fenestrata Uhler, 1862a
Platypleura fulvigera (Walker, 1850)
Platypleura gowdeyi Distant, 1914 – South Africa on Acacia gerrardii
Platypleura haglundi Stål, 1866 – Northwest Province, Free State, Limpopo, Gauteng, Mpumalanga and Kwazulu-Natal, to Zimbabwe, Southern Africa on Acacia karroo, Acacia, Dichrostachys cinerea
Platypleura hilpa (Walker, 1850)
Platypleura hirta Karsch, 1890 – Limpopo, Gauteng and Mpumalanga
Platypleura hirtipennis (Germar, 1834) – Eastern Cape, South Africa on Acacia karroo
Platypleura kaempferi(ja) (Fabricius, 1794) – Japan, China, Russia, Malaysia, Korean Peninsula, Taiwan.
Platypleura kuroiwae Matsumura, 1917 – Japan
Platypleura laticlavia Stål, 1858 – Northwest Province, Limpopo, Northern Cape, Botswana, Namibia
Platypleura lindiana Distant, 1905
Platypleura lyricen Kirkaldy
Platypleura machadoi Boulard, 1972
Platypleura marshalli Distant, 1897
Platypleura maytenophila Villet, 1987 – Kwazulu-Natal, South Africa on Maytenus heterophylla
Platypleura mijburghi Villet, 1989a – Gauteng, Mpumalanga and Limpopo, South Africa on Maytenus heterophylla

Platypleura mira (Distant, 1904) – Thailand
Platypleura miyakona Matsumura, 1917 – Japan
Platypleura murchisoni Distant, 1905e – Mpumalanga
Platypleura nigrolinea (De Geer, 1773) = P. stridula
Platypleura nobilis (Germar, 1830) – Thailand
Platypleura octoguttata (Fabricius, 1798)
Platypleura poorvachala (Marathe et al., 2017)
Platypleura plumosa (Germar, 1834) – Eastern Cape, South Africa on Acacia karroo
Platypleura punctigera Walker, 1850 – Kwazulu-Natal, Eastern Cape
Platypleura quadraticollis Butler, 1874 – Mpumalanga, Limpopo, Botswana, Zimbabwe
Platypleura rutherfordi Distant, 1883
Platypleura signifera Walker, 1850 – Eastern Cape
Platypleura sobrina Stål, 1866
Platypleura stridula (Linnaeus, 1758) – Western Cape, South Africa on Salix
Platypleura sylvia Distant, 1899 – Sekhukhuneland
Platypleura takasagonazh Matsumura, 1917 – Taiwan
Platypleura techowi Schumacher, 1913 – Northern Cape, Free State, North West Province, Limpopo and Mpumalanga
Platypleura turneri Boulard, 1975a – Western Cape
Platypleura wahlbergi Stål, 1855 – Eastern Cape and Kwazulu-Natal, South Africa on Acacia karroo
Platypleura watsoni (Distant, 1897) – Thailand
Platypleura westwoodi Stål, 1863
Platypleura yayeyamana Matsumura, 1917 – Japan
Platypleura zuluensis Villet, 1987 – Eastern Cape, Western Cape, Kwazulu-Natal

References

External links
Taxonomy
Japanese site
List of Homoptera in Swedish Museum of Natural History
An Appraisal of the Higher Classification of Cicadas (Hemiptera: Cicadoidea) with Special Reference to the Australian Fauna - M.S. Moulds
The Cicadas (Hemiptera: Cicadidae) of South Africa (Villet)

 
Insects of Africa
Cicadidae genera
Taxa named by Jean Guillaume Audinet-Serville
Taxa named by Charles Jean-Baptiste Amyot